

List 
 Seyyed Hosein Alavi (1979–1981)
 AbdoulHosein Seyfollahi (1981) 
 Hassan Derakhshandeh Pour (1981–1983)  
 Mohammad-Hassan Malekmadani (1983–1990)  
 Hamid Reza Nikkar (1990–1992)
 Hamid Reza Azimian (1992–1997)
 Mohammad Ali Javadi (1997–2003) 
 Morteza Saghaeiannejad (2003–2015)  
 Mehdi Jamalinejad (2015–2017)
 Ghodratollah Norouzi (2017–2021)
 Ali Ghasemzadeh (2021–present)

See also
 Isfahan
 Timeline of Isfahan

References

Isfahan
Isfahan